Rhodocyclus is a genus of gram-negative bacteria from the family of Rhodocyclaceae which belongs to the class of Betaproteobacteria.

References

Bacteria genera
Rhodocyclaceae